Chalma may refer to:

Afghanistan
Chalma, Afghanistan (alternatively: Calma, Afghanistan)

Iran
Chalma, Iran, a village in Zanjan Province, Iran

Mexico 
Chalma, Malinalco, Mexico State, a place of Roman Catholic pilgrimage in the municipality of Malinalco
Chalma, Veracruz
Chalma (municipality), also in Veracruz